Palahalli Ramaiya (P.R.) Brahmananda (27 September 1926 – 23 January 2003) was a prominent Indian economist best known for his contributions to the field of monetary economics and Indian development policy. The wage goods model devised by Brahmananda and CN Vakil in 1956 is considered relevant to this day. He is also believed to have influenced the anti-inflation policies announced in July 1974 when India was seeing inflation rates as high as 29%. Through his career spanning more than five decades, he published 36 books and more than 700 papers and articles. I G Patel, the former chief economic advisor to the Government of India in 2004 said that few can rival Brahmananda in terms of sheer scholarship and deep understanding of the whole vista of economic knowledge.

Early life and education 
Brahmananda was the eldest of the 4 children of former MLA and Kannada journalist PR Ramaiya and former deputy mayor of Bengaluru P R Jayalakshamma. He was born in the erstwhile state of Mysore and grew up in Bengaluru along with his siblings and extended family. The nationalistic politics of his father and uncles deeply influenced young Brahmananda as he poured over the biographies of prominent freedom fighters such as Mahatma Gandhi, Bal Gangadhar Tilak and Jawaharlal Nehru.

He had his early education in Bengaluru at the Fort High School in Chamrajpet before moving to Mysore for his undergraduate education at Maharaja's College. At Maharaja's College, he was an active student leader In addition to organising protests, sit-ins and lectures, he also played basketball and was keenly interested in cricket. It was at Maharaja's College that he began developing an interest in economics. His teachers at the college, including SL Rama Rao, Tirumalachar, MH Gopal and SLN Simha have been credited for creating a   Brahmananda's desire to acquire more in-depth knowledge in economics and to creatively adapt theories for the Indian context.

After earning his Bachelor of Arts from the University of Mysore, he moved in 1946 to Mumbai to pursue a master's degree in Arts degree in economics from Mumbai University (then University of Bombay). He joined the Department of Economics at Mumbai University as a research assistant to Professor CN Vakil in 1949. Despite securing a high rank, he did not take up a career in the Indian Administrative Services (IAS).

Academic career 
Brahmananda, who joined the Mumbai University in 1949 as a research assistant, obtained his PhD in 1953 with his thesis "Studies in Economics of Welfare Maximisation" under the guidance of Prof D.T Lakdawala. The book was later published by the Bombay University Press. He continued working there for 37 years till he retired in 1986 during which he held various positions within the university. He became a lecturer in 1954, a reader in 1956, the RBI Endowment Reader in Monetary Economics in 1957, the RBI Endowment Professor in Monetary Economics in 1962 and was the Director of the Department of Economics in 1976 till he retired in 1986.

In his last year of association with Mumbai University, he was also a visiting professor at the Delhi School of Economics. Post retirement, he was a UGC National Fellow and ICSSR National Fellow. He continued to be an Honorary Visiting Fellow at the Institute of Social and Economic Change (ISEC) and an Honorary Professor at the Indian Statistical Institute in Bengaluru till his death in 2003.

Through the course of his career, he has also held various prestigious positions. He was the president of the Diamond Jubilee Conference (1976) and the chairman of the Platinum Jubilee Committee(1993–94) of the Indian Economic Association. He was a member of the panel of economists to the erstwhile Planning Commission and Finance Ministry and was an honorary economic advisor to the Government of Maharashtra after its formation. In 1996 he was awarded The Outstanding Economist award by the Financial Express. In 2002 he was made the Honorary President of the International Economic Association.

Contributions to economics 
Eminent economist Dilip M Nachane, in an obituary said that Brahmananda's was a versatile spirit which virtually ranged over all areas of economics with promiscuous abandon. His contributions can be broadly classified into the following four areas:

Development - the Wage Goods Model 
In late 1956, Brahmananda and CN Vakil published a book called "Planning for an Expanding Economy" criticising the focus on capital goods and heavy industries in the Second Five Year Plan. DM Nachane called it  Brahmananda's ‘ lasting contribution to Indian Economics’. Brahmananda and Vakil believed that this strategy was inequitable and in a capital scarce country like India this would lead to limited investment in other more crucial sectors. It will also lead to inflation as demand for consumer goods would increase with increasing incomes. So, as an alternative to the Mahalanobian strategy of the Second Five Year Plan, Brahmananda and Vakil devised the Wage Goods Model.

This strategy advocated giving highest priority to wage goods meaning goods and services that are commonly consumed like foodgrains, milk and milk products, fish, eggs, meat, salt, sugar, soaps, medicines, and also essential needs like basic education, healthcare facilities, and electricity. Vakil and Brahmananda believed that prioritising these sectors would eliminate the demand and supply gap for these goods which would be essential to remove poverty, unemployment and disguised unemployment.

However, in a meeting of the Panel of Senior Economists, 20 of the 21, approved the Mahalanobian five-year plan and the government adopted it. This strategy continued to influence the future five year plans. In a later interview, Brahmananda said that their fierce criticism of the Second Five Year Plan led to him and Vakil being blocked out of all official meetings related to planning. "Anyone who attacked the Mahalanobis model at that time was condemned as an anti-national or worse a CIA agent." he told VN Balasubramian. Throughout his life, Brahmananda was continuously refining the concepts of the wage goods model.

Engagement with development theory and classical economics 
Brahmananda was interested in theoretical aspects of Economics from early days. He kept returning to it at different times in his life. His major contribution to economic theory was the reconstruction of classical economics for developing countries. He provided conceptual refinements to many precepts of welfare economics. In 1961, Pierro Sraffa of Cambridge University released his book "Production of commodities by means of commodities”, a reworking of Ricardian value theory. Brahmananda was the first economist in the world to hail and critique Sraffa's theory and conducted six lectures and wrote three articles on the topic between 1962 and 1963. Sraffa deemed the articles as an achievement and considered them brilliant. Jacob Viner thought them to be equal to Sraffa's in abstraction and thought.

He carried out a parallel exercise to the 'Sraffa Revolution' in search of an invariant measure of value and is credited with enriching the monetary traditions of India. In the area of monetary theory, Professor Brahmananda brought into focus the effect of commodity hoarding on output and prices in developing countries. He also developed general theory of the rate of interest incorporating ideas of Bohm-Bawerk, Schumpeter and Sraffa.

Monetary economics and anti-inflation policies 
In February 1974, when inflation in India had reached a high of 25.3%, Brahmananda prepared a memorandum with proposals to reduce the inflation and submitted it to the then Prime Minister Indira Gandhi. The memorandum, ‘A policy to contain inflation’ was supplemented with a Scheme of the Economists for Monetary Immobilisation through Bond Medallions and Blocked Accounts, also called as SEMIBOMBLA. The memorandum, supported by 140 economists, is believed to have had a considerable impact on the anti-inflation policies announced in July 1974.

The memorandum primarily urged the government to immobilise 30% of money supply by partially remonetisating and issuing liquid savings bonds and blocking accounts with fixed interests. Other proposals include setting a 5% annual limit for increasing money supply and maintaining foreign exchange reserves equal to the value of import requirements for 6 months. It also advocated for an increase in bank rates and freezing of wages, dividends and profits.

While the proposal to limit money supply growth to 5% was ruled out, ordinances were issued for compulsory deposit of additional wages, cutting down of dividends, and the bank rate was increased from 7% to 9%.

From the very beginning, his statements and papers on Indian economy including the government policies received public attention in the press. He kept himself aloof from any government commitment which enabled him to present independent standpoints often non palatable to the authorities. He was a strong proponent for autonomy of the Reserve Bank Of India. The reasons for occasional lack of acceptance of Brahmananda's ideas were (a) they were often very ahead of time and (b) they were couched in pedagogic terms.

Teaching career 
Brahmananda inspired generations of students by his idealism and genuine dedication to the world of learning. He was popular among economics teachers in Indian colleges and universities. Throughout his teaching career at the Mumbai University, he regularly offered courses in development economics, monetary theory, central banking. He also guided 40 students for their doctorate studies. For his decades long teaching in the field of Economics, he was awarded the Best Teacher Award by the Government of Maharashtra. Brahmananda was the editor of the Indian Economic Journal almost since its inception in 1952–53. He also managed several aspects of the journal and saw to it that the journal came out regularly on time. His organisational skills and editorial acumen has been widely credited for the journal's success. He would inspire college teaches to think and write and would urge them to contribute to the journal. This helped them to gain confidence in research and writing papers.

Final years, death and legacy 
Brahmananda was so devoted to economics and the fact that he remained a bachelor, made people in the profession quip that he was married to economics. He wrote two books in the last few years of his life–a history of economic thought from a classical point took the form of ‘Nobel Economics’ in 1999. Commenting on the book, Robert Solow said "this is a work of remarkable scope for a single scholar to write". His last work ‘Money, Income, Prices in 19th Century India' is a historical, qualitative and theoretical study. Lord Meghnad Desai said that the book is a monumental monetary history and is a mine of information not only on the Indian economy but also on high points of monetary history of many other nations

Brahmananda passed away on 23 January 2003 at the age of 76 in his home in Bengaluru. Multiple news organisations published obituaries paying homage to his work. The Financial Express called him the "unsung hero of Indian economics" and said that, "his knowledge of economic theory and the grip on empirical economics was almost encyclopaedic".

In 2004, the Reserve Bank of India instituted the P R Brahmananda Memorial Lecture Series in his memory. The inaugural lecture was delivered by Lord Meghnad Desai in September 2004. Since then four more lectures were delivered till 2018. In 2009, Professor P R Brahmananda Endowment Research Grant was set up at the Institute for Social and Economic Change for an annual research award on monetary policy.

References 

1926 births
2003 deaths
Indian economists
University of Mumbai alumni
University of Mumbai people
People from Mysore
University of Mysore alumni